Chyba is a surname. Notable people with this name include:
Andrew Chyba, Green party candidate for South Wales West in 2011 National Assembly for Wales election
Christopher Chyba, American astrobiologist
Jiří Chyba, Czech paracyclist, competed in 2011 UCI Para-cycling Track World Championships – Men's individual pursuit
Monique Chyba (born 1969), control theorist at the University of Hawaii
Pavel Chyba, Czech fisher, winner of 2010 World Fly Fishing Championships

See also
7923 Chyba, an asteroid named after Christopher Chyba
Chiba (surname)
Chiba (disambiguation)